CHIPS (Cosmic Hot Interstellar Plasma Spectrometer, also Explorer 82 or UNEX-2) was a NASA Explorer program satellite. It was launched on 12 January 2003 from Vandenberg Air Force Base aboard a Delta II with the larger satellite ICESat, and had an intended mission duration of one year. CHIPS was the second of NASA's University Explorer (UNEX) mission class. It performed spectroscopy from 90 to 250 Angstrom (9 to 26-nm) extreme ultraviolet (EUV) light.

Mission 
The primary objective of the science team, led by principal investigator Mark Hurwitz, was to study the million-degree gas in the local interstellar medium. CHIPS was designed to capture the first spectra of the faint, extreme ultraviolet glow that is expected to be emitted by the hot interstellar gas within about 300 light-years of the Sun, a region often referred to as the Local Bubble. Surprisingly, these measurements produced a null result, with only very faint EUV emissions detected, despite theoretical expectations of much stronger emissions. It was the first U.S. mission to use TCP/IP for end-to-end satellite operations control.

Spacecraft 
The University of California, Berkeley's Space Sciences Laboratory (SSL) served as CHIP's primary ground station and manufactured the CHIPS spectrograph, designed to perform all-sky spectroscopy. Other ground network support was provided by ground stations at Wallops Flight Facility (WFF), Virginia and Adelaide, Australia. CHIPS's satellite bus was manufactured by SpaceDev.

Launch 
CHIPS (Cosmic Hot Interstellar Plasma Spectrometer) is a NASA astrophysics spacecraft that was launched by a Delta II launch vehicle from Vandenberg Air Force Base at 00:45:00 UTC on 13 January 2003. The , triaxially-stabilized spacecraft has a spectrograph covering the 9-26 nm wavelength band at a resolution of 0.1 nm, scanning the entire sky in chunks of 5° x 27° segments during each orbit. The targets are the hot and diffuse nebula at about a million degrees temperature. The band covers several strong emission lines.

Solar observatory 
In September 2005, the spacecraft was converted to a solar observatory. From 3 April 2006 to 5 April 2008, CHIPS performed 1458 observations of the Sun.

End of mission 
Satellite operations were terminated in April 2008.

See also 
 Explorer program
 Extreme ultraviolet

References

External links 

 "Good-bye Mr. CHIPS" Chris Thompson, East Bay Express, 2 July 2008
 
 
 

Satellites orbiting Earth
Explorers Program
Satellite Internet access
Spacecraft launched in 2003
Space telescopes
Spacecraft launched by Delta II rockets
Extreme ultraviolet telescopes